"Talking to the Man in the Moon" is a 1989 hit by songwriter Magnus Frykberg and the first charting single by Swedish singer Titiyo from the eponymous debut music album Titiyo. The critically acclaimed single was a "massive late 1980s European hit"; it charted in Sweden for five weeks, and reached no. 6.

References

1989 songs
Titiyo songs